Jindřich Blažek (26 November 1933 – 30 June 1997) was a Czech rower who represented Czechoslovakia. He competed at the 1960 Summer Olympics in Rome with the men's coxless four where they came fourth. He died on 30 June 1997, at the age of 63.

References

1933 births
1997 deaths
Czechoslovak male rowers
Olympic rowers of Czechoslovakia
Rowers at the 1960 Summer Olympics
Rowers from Prague
European Rowing Championships medalists